Harrow School is a public school (English boarding school for boys) in Harrow on the Hill, Greater London, England. The school was founded in 1572 by John Lyon, a local landowner and farmer, under a Royal Charter of Queen Elizabeth I.

The school has an enrolment of about 820 boys, all of whom board full-time, in twelve boarding houses. It was one of the seven public schools selected for reform in the Public Schools Act of 1868.  Harrow's uniform includes morning suits, straw boater hats, top hats and canes.

Its list of distinguished alumni includes seven former British prime ministers: Aberdeen, Perceval, Goderich, Peel, Palmerston, Baldwin and Churchill, as well as the former Indian Prime Minister, Jawaharlal Nehru; numerous former and current members of both Houses of the UK Parliament, several members of various royal families, three Nobel Prize winners, twenty Victoria Cross holders and many prominent figures in the arts and sciences.

History

The Foundation 
The school was founded in February 1572 under a Royal Charter granted by Queen Elizabeth I to John Lyon, a wealthy local farmer. The charter described this as a re-endowment, and there is some evidence of a grammar school at Harrow in the mid-16th century, but its location and connection with Lyon's foundation are unclear. Evidence for earlier schools, possibly connected with the chantry of St Mary (established in 1324), is weak. In the original charter, six governors were named, including two members of the Gerard family of Flambards, and two members of the Page family of Wembley and Sudbury Court.

The founder John Lyon died in 1592, bequeathing his estate to two beneficiaries: the school and the maintenance of two roads, the Harrow Road and the Edgware Road, both going to London, 10 miles (16 km) away. The Road Trust received by far the greater share, the school's share providing just for the salary of The School Master and some minor provisions. This situation, reasonable at the time because of the need to transport merchandise to market, continued until 1991 when the considerable assets of the Road Trust were reassigned to John Lyon's Charity, a charity to provide educational benefits for the inhabitants of the boroughs through which the roads pass.

John Lyon's school was founded to provide free education for 30 (later extended to 40) poor boys of the parish. However, the School Master was permitted to accept "foreigners" (boys from outside the parish) from whom he received fees. It was the need for foreigners to find accommodation that led to the concept of boarding. As in all schools of the time, education was based on the languages and culture of the ancient civilisations of Rome and Greece.

As the reputation of the school grew through the 19th century, the number of foreigners increased, but the local families became increasingly reluctant to impose on their children a classical education and the number of free scholars declined. In 1825 there were 17 free scholars and 219 foreigners. In 1876 the Lower School of John Lyon was founded under the authority of the Governors of Harrow School to provide a modern education for local boys. It is now known as The John Lyon School and is a prominent independent school; it remains part of the Harrow School Foundation.

Buildings 
It was only after the death of Lyon's wife in 1608 that the construction of the first school building began. Known as the Old Schools, it was completed in 1615 and remains to this day, although it was extended and re-designed by architect Charles Cockerell in 1818. It is a Grade I listed building.

The majority of the school's boarding houses were constructed in Victorian times, when the number of boys increased dramatically. Speech Room by William Burges (1877), the chapel (1855) and Vaughan Library (1863) both by Sir George Gilbert Scott are all Grade II* listed buildings. There are 27 School buildings that are Grade II listed, including Head Master's House (1843) by Decimus Burton; Museum Schools (1886) by Basil Champneys; and Music Schools (1890) by Edward Prior.

The school War Memorial building, marking the substantial loss of former pupils in the First World War was designed by Sir Herbert Baker and completed in 1926. Various other buildings such as a central dining hall, sports hall and classroom blocks were added in the 20th century.

Cartel
In 2005, the school was one of fifty of the country's leading independent schools which were found guilty of running an illegal price-fixing cartel, exposed by The Times, which had allowed them to drive up fees for thousands of parents, although the schools said that they had not realised that the change to the law (which had happened only a few months earlier) about the sharing of information had subsequently made it an offence. Each school was required to pay a nominal penalty of £10,000 and all agreed to make ex-gratia payments totalling £3,000,000 into a trust designed to benefit pupils who attended the schools during the period in respect of which fee information was shared. Jean Scott, the head of the Independent Schools Council, said that independent schools had always been exempt from anti-cartel rules applied to business, were following a long-established procedure in sharing the information with each other, and that they were unaware of the change to the law (on which they had not been consulted).

School traditions

Uniform 
Everyday dress for boys at Harrow consists of a dark blue jacket known as a "bluer" with light grey trousers known as "greyers". With these are worn a white shirt, black tie, black shoes and an optional blue jumper (sweater). Boys also wear a Harrow hat, a straw hat with a dark blue band similar to a boater, but shallower in crown and broader in brim. The School blue and white woollen scarf and dark blue woollen overcoat may be worn in cold weather. Variations include boys who are monitors who are allowed to wear a jumper of their choice of colour, and members of certain societies who may earn the right to replace the standard school tie with one of a variety of scarves, cravats, neck and bow ties.

Sunday dress, which is worn every Sunday up to lunch and on special occasions such as Speech Day and songs, consists of a black tailcoat, a black single breasted waistcoat and striped trousers, worn with a white shirt and black tie. Boys with sports colours may wear a grey double breasted waistcoat; members of the Guild (a society for boys who have achieved distinction in art, music or drama) may wear maroon double breasted waistcoats with maroon bowties; members of the Philathletic Club (a society for boys with achievements in sport) may wear black bowties alongside grey double breasted waistcoats. School monitors (prefects) may wear black double breasted waistcoats, a top hat and carry canes.

School houses 

Harrow School divides its pupils, who are all boarders, into twelve Houses, each of about seventy boys, with a thirteenth house, Gayton, used as an overflow. Each House has its own facilities, customs and traditions, and each competes in sporting events against the others.

Until the 1950s there existed what was known as 'small houses' where only 5–10 boys stayed at one time while they waited for a space in a large house to become available (hence the use of the term large house in this article). A twelfth large house, Lyon's, was built in 2010.

House Masters, Assistant House Masters and their families live in the boarding Houses and are assisted by House Tutors appointed from the teaching staff. The House Master oversees the welfare of every boy in his care; for parents, he is the main point of contact with the School.

Each House has a resident matron and sick room. The matrons are supported by the School's Medical Centre where trained nursing staff offer round the clock care. The medical centre is under the direct supervision of the school doctor who is available on the Hill every day for consultation.

There are no dormitories: a boy shares his room for the first three to six terms and thereafter has a room to himself.

Harrow Songs 
The School has a book of songs, of which the best known is Forty Years On. In the 19th century, most schools had a school song, usually in Latin, which they sang at the beginning and end of term. Harrow had a master, Edward Bowen, who was a poet and a music teacher, and John Farmer, who was a composer. Between 1870 and 1885, these two wrote a number of songs about school life. The inspiring, wistful, amusing and thought-provoking words and the attractive tunes, made the songs very popular. Successors to Bowen and Farmer have added to the collection. The Songs are sung in House and School concerts several times a term. Winston Churchill was a great lover of Harrow Songs and when he returned for a concert as Prime Minister in 1940, it was the first of many annual visits. Churchill Songs is still celebrated in Speech Room each year, and every five years at the Royal Albert Hall.

Sport

The sport squash (originally called 'Squasher') was invented in Harrow out of the game rackets around 1830. It spread to other schools, eventually becoming an international sport.

An annual cricket match has taken place between Harrow and Eton College at Lord's Cricket Ground since 1805. It is considered to be the longest-running cricket fixture in the world and is the oldest fixture at Lord's (see: Eton v Harrow). Eton won the match in 2013, and Harrow in 2014 and 2015.

Harrow has its own unique style of football called Harrow Football.

Fagging
As in most boarding schools, for many years there was a system of 'fagging' whereby younger boys carried out duties for the seniors. At Harrow this was phased out in the 1970s and completely banned by 1990. In his detailed history of the school, Tyerman recorded that in 1796 fagging was compulsory for boys up to the fourth form, and that 50 out of 139 boys were then fags. In 1928, Harrow Master, C.H.P. Mayo said of fagging: "Those who hope to rule must first learn to obey... to learn to obey as a fag is part of the routine that is the essence of the English Public School system... the wonder of other countries".

Media coverage
Harrow was featured in a Sky 1 documentary series entitled Harrow: A Very British School in 2013.

In February 2016, the actor Laurence Fox claimed Harrow threatened legal action to prevent him discussing the racism, homophobia and bullying he allegedly encountered as a pupil at the school.

Old Harrovians

Harrow alumni are known as Old Harrovians, they include seven former British prime ministers such as Winston Churchill, Stanley Baldwin and Robert Peel and the first Prime Minister of India, Jawaharlal Nehru. Twenty Old Harrovians have been awarded the Victoria Cross and one the George Cross.

Five monarchs have attended the school: King Hussein of Jordan, both Kings of Iraq, Ghazi I and his son Faisal II, the current Emir of Qatar Sheikh Tamim bin Hamad Al Thani and Ali bin Hamud of Zanzibar.

Harrow is one of the few schools in the UK to have educated several Nobel laureates: John William Strutt, 3rd Baron Rayleigh, who received the Nobel Prize in Physics in 1904; John Galsworthy, winner of the 1932 Nobel Prize in Literature; and Winston Churchill, who also received the Nobel Prize in Literature in 1953.

Other alumni include writers Lord Byron, Anthony Trollope, Sir Terence Rattigan, Simon Sebag-Montefiore, and Richard Curtis, the 6th Duke of Westminster and prominent reformist Lord Shaftesbury, military commanders such as Earl Alexander of Tunis and Sir Peter de la Billiere, and business people (including DeBeers chairman Nicky Oppenheimer, Pret a Manger founder Julian Metcalfe) and the big game hunter and artist General Douglas Hamilton, as well as Island Records founder Chris Blackwell. In sports, the school produced the first two Wimbledon champions (Spencer Gore and Frank Hadow) as well as FA Cup founder C.W. Alcock and current England rugby international players Billy Vunipola, Maro Itoje and Henry Arundell. Alumni in the arts and media industry include actors Edward Fox, Benedict Cumberbatch and Cary Elwes, photographer Count Nikolai von Bismarck, singers Lord David Dundas and James Blunt, pianist James Rhodes, and horse racing pundit John McCririck. Margaret Thatcher sent her son, Mark, to Harrow.

Fictional characters who have attended Harrow include Brett Sinclair of the TV series The Persuaders!, Withnail and Uncle Monty from the film Withnail & I, Herbert Pocket from Charles Dickens's novel, Great Expectations, and Geoffrey Charles Poldark from Poldark.

Notable staff

 David Elleray (born 1954): retired Premier League and FIFA-listed referee, former Druries Housemaster and Head of Geography
 Robert Key (born 1945): Politician; taught economics here 1969-1983
 Herbert Marchant (1906–1990): Bletchley Park alumnus and diplomat, assistant master 1928-1939
 James Morwood (1943–2017): Classical scholar, Head of Classics here 1979-1996
 John Rae (1931–2006): Educator and controversialist
 Douglas Miller Reid1897–1959) biology teacher at Harrow 1921 to 1953, noted botanical author
 Malcolm Nokes (1897–1986) : soldier, airman, Olympic medallist and nuclear scientist; a chemistry master at Harrow from 1946 to 1957, latterly a house master and also Head of Science.
 I. M. B. Stuart (1902–1969) : Writer and broadcaster
 Sir Reginald Thatcher (1888–1975) : Composer and Principal of the Royal Academy of Music, director of music at the school
 Roger Uttley (born 1949): retired England Rugby Captain and British Lions Rugby Player (1974 tour), former head of physical education and 1st XV coach.
 Ronald Watkins (1904–2001) Broadcaster and Shakespeare scholar
 Joe Ansbro (born 1985) International Rugby player for Scotland, teacher of biology and rugby coach

Directors of Music 

 John Farmer, 1862-1885
 Eaton Faning, 1885-1901
 Percy C. Buck, 1901-1927
 R. S. Thatcher, 1927-1936
 Richard Drakeford, 1976-1985
 David Woodcock, 2005–present

Head masters

See also
 Harrow History Prize
 List of Old Harrovians

References

Further reading 
 Rimmer, Rambles round Eton and Harrow, (London, 1882)
 Thornton, Harrow School and its Surroundings, (WH Allen & Co. London, 1885)
 Harrow School Registers, 1571-1800; 1800-1911, 1885-1949; 1971; 1985; 2002 
 Minchin, Old Harrow Days, (London, 1898)
 Archibald Fox, Harrow, (London, 1911)
 G. T. Warner, Harrow in Prose and Verse, (London, 1913)
 Arnold Lunn, The Harrovians, (London, 1913) 
PHM Bryant, Harrow (Blackie & Son, 1936)
ED Laborde, Harrow School Yesterday and Today (Winchester Publications, 1947)
 Christopher Tyerman, A History of Harrow School 1324–1991 (Oxford, 2000) 
Dale Vargas, A Timeline History of Harrow School (Worth Press, 2010) 
Dale Vargas & Ross Beckett, A Hundred and One Eminent Harrovians

External links

 
 
 Harrow School Archives 
 

 
1572 establishments in England
Boarding schools in London
Educational institutions established in the 1570s
Private boys' schools in London
Private schools in the London Borough of Harrow
Racquets venues
Squash in England
Schools with a royal charter
Harrow on the Hill
Schools cricket
Grade I listed buildings in the London Borough of Harrow
Grade II* listed buildings in the London Borough of Harrow
William Burges buildings
Member schools of the Headmasters' and Headmistresses' Conference